Senator Milliken may refer to:

Carl Milliken (1877–1961), Maine State Senate
James T. Milliken (1882–1952), Michigan State Senate
James W. Milliken (1848–1908), Michigan State Senate
William Milliken (1922–2019), Michigan State Senate

See also
Eugene Millikin (1891–1958), U.S. Senator from Colorado from 1941 to 1957